Juan Camilo Mejía Orozco (born August 30, 1981) is former a Colombian professional soccer player.

Mejia most recently played with Once Municipal of Primera División de Fútbol Profesional in El Salvador.

Club career
He began playing professionally for Atlético Bucaramanga in his native country, and has also played for Colombian under-23 national side in the Preolimpicos of Chile and also has a champion's medal next to his name.

References

External links
 
 

1981 births
Living people
Colombian footballers
Categoría Primera A players
Envigado F.C. players
Atlético Bucaramanga footballers
C.D. Águila footballers
C.D. Chalatenango footballers
Leones F.C. footballers
Ayacucho FC footballers
Academia F.C. players
C.D. Vista Hermosa footballers
Once Municipal footballers
Colombian expatriate footballers
Expatriate footballers in Peru
Expatriate footballers in El Salvador
Association football midfielders